ABS Jets is a business jet operator based in Prague, Czech Republic, and Bratislava, Slovak Republic.

ABS Jets is a member of the European Business Aviation Association (EBAA), National Business Aviation Association (NBAA), and Russian Business Aviation Association (RBAA). It is certified as an Embraer Executive Aircraft Service Center.

History 
The company was founded in June 2004 and started operating in December of the same year. It specializes in charter flights, sales organization, repairs and maintenance of aircraft, aviation management, and planning of route schedules in other airlines. In 2007, ABS Jets acquired the hangar at Prague Václav Havel Airport.

In 2013, the company received 2 NBAA safety awards: the Commercial Business Flying Safety Award and the Aviation Support Services Safety Award.

In 2018, ABS Jets received the international IS-BAH award from IBAC.

Since January 2019, ABS Jets has the Stage II International Standard for Business Aircraft Handling (IS-BAH).

Fleet

The ABS Jets fleet includes the following aircraft (as of July 2018):

References

External links

 
LinkedIn Page
ABS Jets receives Russian aircraft maintenance approval
ABS Jets offering the best of both worlds in Prague
ABS Jets Marks 10th Anniversary At EBACE

Airlines of the Czech Republic
Airlines established in 2004
Companies based in Prague
Czech brands
Czech companies established in 2004